Edson Antonio Gutiérrez Moreno (born 19 January 1996) is a Mexican professional footballer who plays as a right-back for Liga MX club Monterrey.

Career statistics

Club

Honours
Monterrey
Liga MX: Apertura 2019
Copa MX: 2019–20
CONCACAF Champions League: 2019, 2021

References

External links
 

Living people
1996 births
Mexican footballers
People from Salamanca, Guanajuato
Liga MX players
Association football midfielders
Association football defenders
Club Celaya footballers
C.F. Monterrey players